Mombasa Road, also known as the Nairobi–Mombasa Road, or Mombasa–Nairobi Road  or      A109 Road (Kenya) is the main road between Nairobi, Kenya's capital and largest city and Mombasa, the country's largest port city. The road is a component of the Northern Corridor.

Location

The road starts in the city of Nairobi, at the confluence of Langata Road, Uhuru Highway and Lusaka Road, immediately west of DHL House. The coordinates of this road south of the town of Athi River, Machakos County are: 01°30'15.0"S, 37°05'20.0"E (Latitude:-1.504167; Longitude:37.088889).

Overview
This road, together with its sister road, Nairobi–Malaba Road, is part of the Great North Road, that links the Kenyan coast to the land-locked countries of Burundi, Eastern DR Congo, Rwanda, Uganda and South Sudan. The road moves more than 50 percent of all goods traded in the East African Community. Due to the volume of traffic, and the concentration of heavy-duty transport vehicles, the route is accident-prone, accounting for a large number of injuries and fatalities in the region. In 2013 alone, 3,179 people lost their lives in traffic accidents on the combined Mombasa–Malaba Road.

The government of Kenya has plans to expand the road to dual carriageway, with a total of six lanes outside Mombasa Island, increasing the number of lanes to twelve, on the island itself. It is expected that solicitation of bids from funders and contractors will be announced before the end of calendar 2016. When completed, the road will become Nairobi–Mombasa Expressway

Towns
The following towns, listed from west towards the east, are located along the highway:

Intersections
The following major intersections lie along the Nairobi–Mombasa Road, listed from the west towards the east:

 The Nairobi–Malaba Road, also referred to as the Nairobi–Uganda Road
 The Nairobi–Namanga Road, part of the Nairobi–Arusha Road
 The Voi–Taveta Road
 The Mariakani–Kaloleni–Mavueni Road
 The Dongo Kundu Bypass Highway
 The Mombasa–Garissa Road
 The Malindi–Bagamoyo Highway.

See also 
 Trans-African Highway network
 List of roads in Kenya

References

External links

 Mombasa Road: Real Estate, Apartments and Houses

((coord|01|30|15|S|37|05|20|E|display=title))

Roads in Kenya
Streets in Nairobi
Machakos County
Kajiado County
Makueni County
Taita-Taveta County
Kwale County
Mombasa County